The M64 is a short metropolitan route in Johannesburg, South Africa. The M64 begins at M81 William Nicol Drive and passes through Bryanston and Douglasdale suburbs in the northern suburbs of Johannesburg.

Route 
The route is at first named Grosvenor Road and crosses over William Nicol Drive, now signed as the M81 as it enters the Johannesburg metropolitan. The route quickly crosses over the M71 Main Road and enters Western Bryanston affluent suburbs. The route passes M75 Bryanston Drive, and continues through Bryanston; passing SAB Offices and the affluent BryanPark Shopping Centre. Once the route crosses over the N1 Highway (Western Bypass), it changes name to "Douglas Drive" as it enters into Douglasdale; home of the original Norscot Manor and Douglas Milk. It continues for 1.2 km until it terminates and ends at the R564 Witkoppen Road intersection.

References 

Streets and roads of Johannesburg
Metropolitan routes in Johannesburg